The Way Home may refer to:
 The Way Home (2002 film), a South Korean film by Lee Jeong-hyang
 The Way Home (2010  film), an American film with Dean Cain
 The Way Home, also known as Veettilekkulla Vazhi, a 2010 Indian Malayalam film
 The Way Home (novel), a 1925 novel by Henry Handel Richardson in the trilogy The Fortunes of Richard Mahony
 The Way Home (short story), a short story by Franz Kafka written between 1904 and 1912
 The Way Home (2023 TV series), a 2023 television series starring Andie MacDowell and Chyler Leigh
 The Way Home (Russ Taff album), a 1989 album by Russ Taff
 The Way Home (album), a 2019 album by The McClures
 The Way Home (Kevin Braheny album), a 1978 album by Kevin Braheny
 The Way Home (play), a 2006 play by Chloe Moss
 The Way Home (Pelecanos novel), a 2009 novel by George Pelecanos
 The Way Home (Mary Pride book), a 1985 non-fiction book by Mary Pride

See also 
 Put Domoi (The Way Home), a Russian street newspaper